Maxambomba Rugby Club is the first Rugby club of Baixada Fluminense, Rio de Janeiro, Brazil. It was founded on April 12, 2008, and the club is affiliated to the State of Rio de Janeiro Rugby Federation (FFRu).

History
After watching the Rugby World Cup 2007 on TV, Vitor Magalhães had the idea to create a rugby team in his own city. So he posted in a social network and met some people that read that and joined him on his dream. After a meeting in Nova Iguaçu, Maxambomba Rugby Club was founded.

With less than a year, the team started to play State of Rio de Janeiro 2nd Division Championship. In 2014, the "Orange Warrior" reached the 1st Division of Rio and it was a great experience, but in 2015 returned to 2nd.

Training Days
Maxambomba has two training days:

 Wednesday, 19:00 to 21:00 Nova Iguaçu Olympic Ground
 Saturday, 14:00 to 16:00 Mesquita Olympic Ground

Home ground 
 
Maxambomba's home ground is Nielsen Louzada Stadium, in Mesquita, with that said, Maxambomba is the closest rugby club where will take place the Rio 2016, in Deodoro.

Contact 

 Website
 Facebook 
 Twitter

Rugby clubs established in 2008
Brazilian rugby union teams